The 2003 Duke Blue Devils football team represented the Duke University in the 2003 NCAA Division I-A football season. The team participated as members of the Atlantic Coast Conference. They played their homes games at Wallace Wade Stadium in Durham, North Carolina. The team was led by head coach Carl Franks, who was fired during the season and replaced by interim head coach, Ted Roof.  Duke won two of the last three games of the season under Roof earning him the full-time coaching position.

Schedule

Roster

Team players in the NFL

References

Duke
Duke Blue Devils football seasons
Duke Blue Devils football